"A*G*A*P*I (Crashing Down)" (Greek: Α*Γ*Α*Π*Η; English: L-O-V-E) is the debut single by the Greek Cypriot singer Ivi Adamou from her first album Kalokairi Stin Kardia, written by Leo Chantzaras, Keely Hawkes, Bruce Howell and Giannis Doxas. It was released on January 25, 2010.

Background and release
After her elimination from The X Factor, she signed a contract with Sony Music Greece and released her first single a few days later. On 25 January 2010, the single was released. Adamou first performed the song in Aksizei na to deis, a program in ANT1.

Track listing
Digital download
"A*G*A*P*I (Crashing Down)" – 3:44
"A*G*A*P*I (Crashing Down)" (Karaoke version) – 3:44
"Crashing Down" - 3:44

Credits and personnel
 Lead vocals – Ivi Adamou
 Producers – Leo Chantzaras
 Lyrics – Leo Chantzaras, Keely Hawkes, Bruce Howell, Giannis Doxas
 Label: Sony Music Greece/Day 1

Music video
The video music was published in Ivi's official channel in February 2010. The video was later blocked by SME and was published in November 2011 on Ivi's VEVO channel. It was the first video in the channel.

Charts and certifications

Peak positions

Release history

References

2010 debut singles
Ivi Adamou songs
Songs written by Giannis Doxas
2010 songs